I Love You, Don't Touch Me! is a 1997 independent film starring Marla Schaffel and Mitchell Whitfield and written and directed by Julie Davis.

Plot
Katie is a 25-year-old virgin who wants to save herself for the ideal man. As time passes, however, she becomes convinced the ideal man doesn't exist. Katie is good friends with Ben, who is crazy about her and wants to move their relationship from friendship to romance; she does not feel the same way about him, however. When Katie meets Richard, a talented British songwriter, she thinks that she may have finally the right man.

References

External links

1997 films
American independent films
1997 romantic comedy films
American romantic comedy films
Metro-Goldwyn-Mayer films
Orion Pictures films
The Samuel Goldwyn Company films
1990s English-language films
1990s American films